Jerry Marasigan, WPD is a 1992 Filipino action film directed by Augusto Salvador. The film stars Jestoni Alarcon as the titular policeman, alongside Gretchen Barretto, John Regala, Patrick dela Rosa, Tobi Alejar, Michael de Mesa, Leo Martinez, Jimmy Fabregas, and Joboy Gomez. Produced by Seiko Films, it was released on July 8, 1992.

Critic Justino Dormiendo of the Manila Standard gave the film a negative review, criticizing its shallow antagonists and overall "boring" quality.

Cast
Jestoni Alarcon as Jerry Marasigan
Gretchen Barretto
John Regala as Winston
Patrick dela Rosa
Tobi Alejar
Michael de Mesa
Leo Martinez
Jimmy Fabregas
Joboy Gomez
Dick Israel
Joonee Gamboa
Conrad Poe
Rusty Santos
Ramon d'Salva
Ernie David
Debraliz Valazote
Karen Salas
Cristina Crisol
Glenda Garcia

Release
Jerry Marasigan was released in theaters on July 8, 1992.

Critical response
Justino Dormiendo of the Manila Standard gave the film a negative review, considering it to be "totally boring [...] from beginning to end." He criticized the main group of antagonists, the Red Hand Gang, as "cardboard characters" that lack a satisfactory explanation in why they kill people, and stated that the performances of Alarcon, Barretto, and the actors for the said gang "fail to rise above the mundane." Dormiendo concluded that "[f]or an action film, Jerry Marasigan WPD has been sapped of imagination."

References

External links

1992 films
1992 action films
Filipino-language films
Films about police officers
Films set in Manila
Philippine action films
Seiko Films films
Films directed by Augusto Salvador